Coleophora kondarensis is a moth of the family Coleophoridae. It is found in Tajikistan.

The larvae feed on Astragalus sieversianus. They feed on the leaves of their host plant.

References

kondarensis
Insects of Central Asia
Moths of Asia
Moths described in 1976